Love Songs is a compilation album by Greek keyboardist and composer Yanni, released on the Private Music label in 1999. The album peaked at #1 on Billboard's "Top New Age Albums" chart and at #98 on the "Billboard 200" chart in the same year.

Track listing

References

External links
Official Website

Yanni albums
1999 compilation albums
Private Music compilation albums